Puzhehei railway station is a railway station in Qiubei County, Wenshan Zhuang and Miao Autonomous Prefecture, Yunnan, China. It opened on 28 December 2016. The station is situated at the terminus of Line 4 of Wenshan Tram.

References 

Railway stations in Yunnan
Railway stations in China opened in 2016